Shigella dysenteriae is a species of the rod-shaped bacterial genus Shigella. Shigella species can cause shigellosis (bacillary dysentery). Shigellae are Gram-negative, non-spore-forming, facultatively anaerobic, nonmotile bacteria. S. dysenteriae has the ability to invade and replicate in various species of epithelial cells and enterocytes.

Epidemiology
Shigella infections may be contracted by a lack of monitoring of water and food quality, unsanitary cooking conditions and improper hygiene practices. 
S. dysenteriae spreads through contaminated water and food, causes minor dysentery because of its Shiga toxin, but other species may also be dysentery agents. S. dysenteriae releases an exotoxin that compromises the gut and central nervous system. If acting as an enterotoxin, diarrhea will occur. When acting as a neurotoxin, severe cases of shigellosis are developed, inducing comas and meningismus.

Contamination is often caused by bacteria on unwashed hands during food preparation, or soiled hands reaching the mouth.

Signs and symptoms
The most commonly observed signs associated with Shigella dysentery include colitis, malnutrition, rectal prolapse, tenesmus, reactive arthritis, and central nervous system problems. Further, S. dysenteriae is associated with the development of hemolytic-uremic syndrome, which includes anemia, thrombocytopenia, and kidney failure. If infected with S. dysenteriae, an individual will experience a severe case of shigellosis.
Mortality is higher with S. dysenteriae type 1. Most cases of shigellosis are in developing countries. Shigellosis outbreaks in Asia, Latin America and Africa have had mortality rates of up to 20%.

Diagnosis
Since the typical fecal specimen is not sterile, the use of selective plates is mandatory. XLD agar, DCA agar, or Hektoen enteric agar are inoculated; all give colorless colonies as the organism is not a lactose fermenter. Inoculation of a TSI slant shows an alkaline slant and acidic, but with no gas, or  production. Following incubation on SIM, the culture appears nonmotile with no  production. Addition of Kovac's reagent to the SIM tube following growth typically indicates no indole formation (serotypes 2, 7, and 8 produce indole). 
Mannitol tests yields negative results. Ornithine Decarboxylase tests yield negative results.

Treatment
Treatment for shigellosis, independent of the subspecies, requires an antibiotic. Commonly used antibiotics include ampicillin, ciprofloxacin, ceftriaxone, among others. Opioids should be avoided for treatment of Shigellosis.

See also
 Hand washing

References

External links
 Shigella dysenteriae at the NCBI Taxonomy Browser 
 Type strain of Shigella dysenteriae at BacDive, the Bacterial Diversity Metadatabase

Enterobacteriaceae
Bacteria described in 1919